Julien Arias (born 26 October 1983) is a French rugby union coach and former player, he is currently the co-head coach of Stade Français in Top 14 with Laurent Sempéré. His usual position was on the wing. Prior to playing for Stade Français Paris, he was with US Colomiers. He has also represented France two times.

Modeling
Arias was on the cover of the 2007 Dieux Du Stade calendar and posed nude in other pictures starting in 2005.

Personal life
Arias was born in France to a Spanish father, and a French mother.

Club
 Until 2000 : Cadeneaux-Vitrolles
 2000–2004  : US Colomiers
 2004–2019: Stade Français Paris

Club
 Top 14: 2007, 2015
 Finalist: 2005
 Heineken Cup Finalist: 2005

National team
 France national rugby union team: 2 caps vs. Australia, Fiji
 France A: 1 cap vs. Ireland Wolfhounds

Playing Summary

References

External links
ERC profile

French rugby union players
French rugby union coaches
French people of Spanish descent
Rugby union wings
Stade Français players
1983 births
Living people
France international rugby union players
Stade Français coaches